The Reclamation Act (also known as the Lowlands Reclamation Act or National Reclamation Act) of 1902 is a United States federal law that funded irrigation projects for the arid lands of 20 states in the American West.

The act at first covered only 13 of the western states as Texas had no federal lands. Texas was added later by a special act passed in 1906. The act set aside money from sales of semi-arid public lands for the construction and maintenance of irrigation projects. The newly irrigated land would be sold and money would be put into a revolving fund that supported more such projects. This led to the eventual damming of nearly every major western river. Under the act, the Secretary of the Interior created the United States Reclamation Service within the United States Geological Survey to administer the program. In 1907, the Service became a separate organization within the Department of the Interior and was renamed the United States Bureau of Reclamation.

The Act was co-authored by Democratic Congressional Representative Francis G. Newlands of Nevada and George H. Maxwell, head of the National Reclamation Association. Many of the loans made to farmers, funded by the sales of federal land, were never repaid.  Amendments made by the Reclamation Project Act of 1939 gave the Department of the Interior, among other things, the authority to amend repayment contracts and to extend repayment for not more than 40 years. Amendments made by the Reclamation Reform Act of 1982 (P.L. 97-293) eliminated the residency requirement provisions of reclamation law, raised the acreage limitation on lands irrigated with water supplied by the Bureau of Reclamation, and established and required full-cost rates for land receiving water above the acreage limit.

Background
John Wesley Powell, often considered the father of reclamation, began a series of expeditions to explore the American West in 1867. He saw that after snowmelt and spring rains, the rivers of the West flooded, releasing huge amounts of water and that for the rest of the year, not enough rain fell to support any kind of real agriculture. He concluded that the Western United States was so arid that it could not yet support extensive development. The U.S. government saw too much economic potential in the West to heed Powell's warning. By damming western rivers to support massive irrigation projects, population growth and farming were made possible.

Several private and local farming organizations proved the benefits of irrigation projects. When it became apparent that a greater effort would be required, Representative Francis G. Newlands of Nevada introduced legislation into the United States Congress to provide federal help for irrigation projects. The resulting act passed on June 17, 1902.

Newlands carried the bulk of the legislative burden and had a strong technical backup from Frederick Haynes Newell of the Department of the Interior. President Theodore Roosevelt assembled the legislative alliances that made passage of the act possible.

It was later amended by the Reclamation Reform Act of 1982 (Title II) to limit the corporate use of water and speculation on land that would benefit from irrigation.  Reclamation includes draining, too.

Summary of the Act
The full name of the act is "An Act Appropriating the receipts from the sale and disposal of public lands in certain States and Territories to the construction of irrigation works for the reclamation of arid lands". The act identifies 16 states and territories included in the project: Arizona, California, Colorado, Idaho, Kansas, Montana, Nebraska, Nevada, New Mexico, North Dakota, Oklahoma, Oregon, South Dakota, Utah, Washington, and Wyoming. It requires surplus fees from sales of land be set aside for a "reclamation fund" for the development of water resources. It also requires the Treasury Department to fund education from unappropriated monies under certain conditions

Impact of the act
Below are listed the larger of the irrigation projects of the United States, with the area reclaimed or to be reclaimed as of 1925. (1)  
 Arizona:  Salt River, 182,000  
 Arizona-California:  Yuma, 158,000  
 California:  Orland, 20,000  
 Colorado:  Grand Valley, 53,000;  Uncompahgre Valley, 140,000  
 Idaho:   Boise, 207,000;  Minidoka, 120,500 
 Kansas:  Garden City, 10,677  
 Montana:  Blackfeet, 122,500;  Flathead, 152,000;  Fort Peck, 152,000;  Huntley, 32,405;  Milk River, 219,557;  Sun River, 174,046  
 Montana-North Dakota:  Lower Yellowstone, 60,116  
 Nebraska-Wyoming:  North Platte, 129,270  
 Nevada:  Truckee-Carson, 206,000  
 New Mexico:  Carlsbad, 20,261;  Hondo, 10,000;  Rio Grande, 155,000  
 North Dakota: North Dakota Pumping, 26, 314  
 Oregon:  Umatilla, 36,300  
 Oregon-California:  Klamath, 70,000  
 South Dakota:  Belle Fourche, 100,000  
 Utah:  Strawberry Valley, 50,000  
 Washington: Okanogan, 10,999;  Sunnyside, 102,824;  Tieton (Teton), 34,071  
 Wyoming:  Shoshone, 164,122

Much of the West could not have been settled without the water provided by the Act. The West became one of the premier agricultural areas in the world. Bureau of Reclamation statistics shows that the more than 600 of their dams on waterways throughout the West provide irrigation for 10 million acres (40,000 km²) of farmland, providing 60% of the nation's vegetables and 25% of its fruits and nuts. Currently, the Bureau operates about 180 projects in the West.

Not envisioned by the act, Bureau of Reclamation dams support 58 power plants producing 40 billion kilowatt hours of electricity annually. Most of the large population centers in the Far West owe their growth to these power sources.

Affected river systems
 Colorado River system
 Columbia River system
 Missouri River system
 Rio Grande system

See also
 Water in California
 Water in Colorado
 Water rights
 National Irrigation Congress

References

External links
 Newlands Reclamation Act of 1902
 United States Bureau of Reclamation
 United States Bureau of Reclamation History
 Millions of New Acres for American Farmers, Hamilton Wright, National Magazine, November 1905 (with photos)
 

1902 in American law
Progressive Era in the United States
United States Bureau of Reclamation
Water in California
Water in Colorado
United States federal public land legislation